Clayton is both an English surname and a masculine given name. Notable people with the name include:

Science and academia

Surname 

 Ruth Clayton (1925–2003), British medical researcher

Historical

Surname

Augustin Smith Clayton (1783–1839), jurist and politician from Georgia, USA
Bertram Tracy Clayton (1862–1918), U.S. congressman and army officer killed in World War I
Boyce G. Clayton (1929–2020), Justice of the Kentucky Supreme Court 
Christopher Clayton, Royal Navy pilot and admiral
Christopher Clayton (businessman) (1869–1945), British scientist, industrialist and Conservative politician
Gilbert Clayton (1875–1929), British Army intelligence officer and colonial administrator
Hilda Clayton (1991–2013), U.S. Army specialist and war photographer
Henry Clayton (disambiguation), several people
Iltyd Nicholl Clayton (1886–1955), British Army officer
John Clayton (disambiguation), several people
Joseph Clayton (1868–1943), English freelance journalist and biographer
Joshua Clayton (1744–1798), physician, governor and U.S. senator from Delaware
Nathaniel Clayton (1833–1895), British politician
Pat Clayton (1896–1962), desert explorer
Powell Clayton (1833–1914), Arkansas Governor, Senator and U.S. Ambassador to Mexico
Preston C. Clayton (1903–1996), justice of the Supreme Court of Alabama
Robert Clayton (disambiguation), several people
Sarah Clayton (1712–1779), English industrialist
Thomas Clayton (1777–1854), lawyer and U.S. senator from Delaware
Thomas J. Clayton (1826–1900), lawyer and judge from Pennsylvania
Tubby Clayton (1885–1972), Anglican clergyman, army chaplain and founder of Toc H
Walter F. Clayton (1865–1942), New York politician
William Clayton (disambiguation), several people
Willie Clayton (born 1955), American blues singer and songwriter

Given name

Clayton Cosgrove (born 1969), New Zealand politician
Clayton D. Potter (1880–1924), Justice of the Supreme Court of Mississippi
Clayton Yeutter (1930–2017), American politician and Secretary of Agriculture

Cultural and artistic

Surname

Adam Clayton (born 1960), bassist in U2
Beth Clayton, American mezzo-soprano
Bob Clayton (1922–1979), American game show announcer
Buck Clayton (1911–1991), American jazz trumpeter
Cameron Clayton (born 1993), American drag queen under the stage name Farrah Moan
Doctor Clayton (1898–1947), American blues singer
Ellen Creathorne Clayton (1834–1900), Irish author and artist
Jamie Clayton (born 1978), American actress and model
Jan Clayton (1917–1983), American actress
Jay Clayton (critic) (born 1951), literary critic and professor
Jay Clayton (musician) (born 1941), jazz singer
Klariza Clayton (born 1989), English actress and singer
Merry Clayton (born 1948), American singer
Peter Clayton (1927–1991), BBC jazz presenter, jazz critic, and author
R. Gilbert Clayton (1922–2013), American film set designer and actor

Given name

Clayton Chitty (born 1985), Canadian actor and model
Clayton Christensen (1952–2020), American academic and business consultant
Clayton Hickman (born 1977), British scriptwriter and magazine editor
Clayton Howard (1934–2017), British make-up artist
Clayton Moore (1914–1999), American actor best known for playing the Lone Ranger in a television series of the same name
Clayton Rohner (born 1957), American film and television actor

Sport

Surname
Adam Clayton (footballer) (born 1989), English footballer
Andrew Clayton (born 1973), English freestyle swimmer
Custio Clayton (born 1987), Canadian boxer
Derek Clayton (born 1942), Australian marathon runner
Jim Clayton (rower) (1911–1992), New Zealand rower
Jonny Clayton (born 1974), Welsh darts player
José Clayton (born 1974), Brazilian-Tunisian footballer
Josh Clayton (born 1996), Australian rules footballer
Mark Clayton (American football, born 1961), American football player
Mark Clayton (American football, born 1982), American football player
Max Clayton (born 1994), English footballer
Michael Clayton (American football) (born 1982), American football player
Royce Clayton (born 1970), Major League Baseball player
Scott Clayton (born 1959), Australian rules footballer
Tom Clayton (jockey) (–1909), Australian jockey

Given name

 Clayton Andrews (born 1997), American professional baseball player
Clayton Michel Afonso (born 1988), Brazilian footballer
Clayton Bezerra Leite (born 1987), Brazilian footballer
Clayton da Silveira da Silva (born 1995), Brazilian footballer
Clayton Donaldson (born 1984), English-Jamaican footballer
Clayton Fernandes Silva (born 1999), Brazilian footballer
Clayton Keller (born 1998), American ice hockey player
Clayton Kershaw (born 1988), American professional baseball player
Clayton Lambert (born 1962), West Indian cricketer
Clayton Murphy (born 1995), American athlete
Clayton Nascimento Meireles (born 1989), Brazilian footballer
Clayton Oliver (born 1997), Australian rules footballer
Clayton Richard (born 1983), American professional baseball player
Clayton Thorson (born 1995), American football player
Clayton Tonnemaker (1928–1996), American football player
Clayton Tune (born 1999), American football player

Fictional characters
Michael Clayton, title character in 2007 Oscar-nominated film of the same name
Clayton, a character and the main antagonist in the 1999 Walt Disney's animated film Tarzan
Clayton Endicott III, character in the American television series Benson
Clayton Farlow, oil baron in the American television series Dallas

See also
Justice Clayton (disambiguation)

English-language surnames
English toponymic surnames
English masculine given names